Omberto Aldobrandeschi (? - 1259; sometimes anglicized as Omberto Aldobrandesco), was a member of the Aldobrandeschi family and a Count of Santafiore in the Maremma of Siena. Counts of Santafiore were usually in wars against the city of Siena. In 1259, Omberto was killed in one of these battles, at the village of Campagnatico. Omberto is mentioned in Canto XI of Purgatorio of Divine Comedy by Dante, as an example of a sinner of pride.

References

Year of birth unknown
1259 deaths
Date of death unknown
Place of birth unknown
Counts of Italy
People from Siena